Raymond Atteveld (born 8 September 1966) is a Dutch professional football manager and former player who is the assistant coach of Ukrainian Premier League club Zorya Luhansk.

Playing career

Club
Atteveld played for Haarlem before moving to England to join Everton.

He made his debut for Everton on 2 December 1989 against Coventry City, in a 2–0 home win. During his career at Everton, he made 41 league appearances from the outset and a further 10 as a substitute, scoring only one goal. Atteveld is one of seven Dutchmen to have played for Everton, the others being Andy van der Meyde, Sander Westerveld, Johnny Heitinga, Royston Drenthe, Davy Klaassen and Maarten Stekelenburg.

Atteveld was one of the first foreigners to get a regular first-team place in the Everton squad although he struggled to make a name of himself in the English game. Atteveld is remembered by Evertonians for stripping during an end of season lap of honour and throwing his kit into the crowd.

He joined West Ham United on loan, and became the first Dutch player in the club's history when he made played his only league game for the club on 22 February 1992, a 2–1 defeat at Sheffield Wednesday. He made two FA Cup appearances for the club, for the Fifth Round games against Sunderland on 15 February and 26 February.

The tough-tackling holding midfielder joined ambitious Vitesse in summer 1995 from high-flying Roda JC, only to move to FC Groningen a year later. In summer 1999, Atteveld left FC Groningen for ADO Den Haag.

Managerial career
Atteveld worked as an assistant manager for Roda in 2006, until 2007, where he was promoted to manager/technical director after the departure of Huub Stevens. He qualified for the play-offs for European football, only to miss out going into Europe by 2 draws in the encounter with FC Utrecht. However, due to struggles within the board after the placement of a new technical director, he was sacked on 7 October 2008.
On 17 April 2009, he replaced André Wetzel as the new ADO Den Haag manager/technical director. Atteveld managed to keep ADO Den Haag in the Dutch Premier league with scoring 12 goals in the last 4 games of that season. The following season, Atteveld now replaced Wetzel as Technical Director to finish the season. In that summer Atteveld refused to continue in his present role and therefore left the club on mutual terms in the summer of 2010.
In February 2011 he moved abroad to coach Cypriot outfit AEL Limassol on an interim basis. AEL Limassol reached the play-offs under Atteveld. He mainly played with youngsters due to non salary payment of 1st team regulars. This working with the AEL youngsters resulted in Atteveld taking the Academy Director role the following seasons to come.
As an Academy Director Atteveld introduced a successful playing style all throughout the club. 300% increase in National Team players was the result of this approach. Up until today, his philosophy and structure are still used within the club.

Atteveld later went on to supervise as Senior Academy consultant at FC Banants Yerevan in Armenia before moving to Kazakhstan in 2013. In Kazakhstan Atteveld was Academy Director for the U14 until U19 teams. During this time the Kazakh outfit, FC Kairat Almaty, broke all records regarding championships. Many players of the academy broke into the National Team of Kazakhstan. In 2013-2014 season, 3 teams of the Academy became champions of Kazakhstan. In 2014-2015 4 teams took the championship, only to be improved by 5 championship winning teams in 2015-2016. A record set for Kazakhstan by any club, and up until today FC Kairat Almaty still holds this record. At the beginning of the season 2016-2017 Atteveld was offered the role of Head Coach of FC Kairat Almaty B team, operating in Div. 2. Atteveld kindly declined for this position and went on to introduce his own Academy, the Dutch Total Football Academy in Almaty. A call from Maccabi Tel Aviv FC in Israel to strengthen their setup ended this private academy adventure early on.

In Israel, at the biggest club of Israel - Maccabi Tel Aviv FC, Atteveld arrived in Sept. 2016 to take charge of the football development of the older Academy coaches & players for the U16, U17 and U19 teams. As a Performance Director, Atteveld introduced, among other things, the concept of Elite training for contract players within the academy while setting out an individual program for every player.
Atteveld was tasked with leading a team in Div. 2 with prospects loaned from Maccabi Tel Aviv FC <ref>. The club, named Beitar Tel Aviv Bat Yam is operating in the 2nd division and presently the youngest team in this league (average age 20yrs). Now in 7th position, before the coronavirus brought a stop to the league. Teams within the positions 1-8 will qualify for the promotion play-offs at the end of the season. With 2 games to go before the regular season will end, Atteveld and Beitar Tel Aviv Bat Yam are in a perfect position to reach the promotion play-offs. During the winter break some players did move to the IPL, with more on the cards for the next season.<ref>

References

External links
  Raymond Atteveld club history
  Profile

1966 births
Living people
Footballers from Amsterdam
Association football fullbacks
Association football midfielders
Dutch footballers
HFC Haarlem players
Everton F.C. players
West Ham United F.C. players
Bristol City F.C. players
K.S.V. Waregem players
Roda JC Kerkrade players
SBV Vitesse players
FC Groningen players
ADO Den Haag players
Dutch expatriate footballers
Eredivisie players
Eerste Divisie players
English Football League players
Expatriate footballers in England
Dutch football managers
Dutch expatriate football managers
Roda JC Kerkrade managers
ADO Den Haag managers
AEL Limassol managers
Beitar Tel Aviv Bat Yam F.C. managers
Maccabi Netanya F.C. managers
Eredivisie managers
Israeli Premier League managers
Expatriate football managers in Cyprus
Expatriate football managers in Israel
Expatriate football managers in Ukraine
Dutch expatriate sportspeople in England
Dutch expatriate sportspeople in Belgium
Dutch expatriate sportspeople in Cyprus
Dutch expatriate sportspeople in Israel
Dutch expatriate sportspeople in Ukraine
Maccabi Tel Aviv F.C. non-playing staff